Hartmann Grasser (23 August 1914 – 2 June 1986) was a World War II German fighter ace. He was credited with shooting down 103 Allied aircraft while flying 700 missions on the Western Front, Eastern Front, and in North Africa. He was also a recipient of the Knight's Cross of the Iron Cross with Oak Leaves.

Early life and career
Grasser was born on 23 August 1914 in Graz, Steiermark, Austria. After he received his Abitur, he started studying medicine and became a member of the Austrian Nazis. Following the failed coup attempt in the July Putsch, Grasser fled to Germany. On 1 April 1936, Grasser then joined the Luftwaffe with the rank of Fahnenjunker (cadet). Following flight training, he was posted to I. Gruppe (1st group) of Zerstörergeschwader 52 (ZG 52—52nd Destroyer Wing) where he served with 3. Staffel (3rd squadron) of ZG 52.

World War II
World War II in Europe began on Friday 1 September 1939 when German forces invaded Poland. At the time ZG 52 was commanded by Hauptmann Wilhelm Lessmann and was based at Biblis where it was tasked with protecting Germany's western border in the Saar region during the "Phoney War". On 16 September, Grasser shot down a tethered balloon. The following day, he was awarded the Iron Cross second Class. A week later, on 24 September 1939, his Messerschmitt Bf 109 109 D-1 was damaged in combat with a French Morane-Saulnier M.S.406, resulting in a forced landing at Bingen. That day, I. Gruppe of ZG 52 was also renamed and became the Jagdgruppe 152 (JGr. 152—152nd Fighter Group). On 6 January 1940, JGr. 152 was ordered to Graz where it was reequipped with the Messerschmitt Bf 110 heavy fighter and was renamed, again becoming the I. Gruppe of ZG 52. This unit was then renamed and became the II. Gruppe of Zerstörergeschwader 2 (ZG 2—2nd Destroyer Wing). In consequence, Grasser became a pilot of 6. Staffel. Flying with this squadron, he participated in the Battle of France and Battle of England and claimed six aerial victories. During these campaigns, Grasser was promoted to Oberleutnant (first lieutenant) on 1 June 1940 and received the Iron Cross first Class on 7 July.

With Jagdgeschwader 51
In October 1940, Grasser was transferred to Jagdgeschwader 51 (JG 51—51st Fighter Wing). There, he was assigned to the Geschwaderstab headed by Oberstleutnant Werner Mölders. Prior to his posting to JG 51, Grasser had been destined to become a night fighter pilot which was not what he wanted to do. Additionally, he helped in the formation of the Z-Staffel (Z—Zerstörer or destroyer) of Jagdgeschwader 77 (JG 77—77th Fighter Wing) which later became part of Jagdgeschwader 5 (JG 5—5th Fighter Wing). Grasser also served as a test pilot, flying the Bf 109 T, the aircraft carrier variant, which were to be produced at Fieseler in Kassel. His acquaintance, Oberleutnant Hans Kolbow, introduced him to Mölders who arranged the transfer to JG 51 instead.

Grasser claimed his first aerial victory flying with JG 51 on 1 December 1940 when he shot down a Royal Air Force (RAF) Hawker Hurricane fighter near Ashford.

On the Eastern Front
In June 1941, JG 51 and the majority of the Luftwaffe were transferred to the Eastern Front in preparation for Operation Barbarossa, the invasion of the Soviet Union. On 16 July 1941, Kolbow, the Staffelkapitän of 5. Staffel (5th squadron) was killed in action. He was replaced by Leutnant Hans-Joachim Steffens who also killed in action shortly after. On 1 August, command of 5. Staffel was then handed to Grasser. The Staffel was a squadron of II. Gruppe, at the time commanded by Hauptmann Hubertus von Bonin. On 11 October, the Gruppe was briefly detached from the Geschwaderstab (headquarters unit) of JG 51 and ordered east to Oryol. There, the Gruppe was subordinated to Gefechtsverband Schönborn (Detachment Schönborn), named after the commander of Sturzkampfgeschwader 77 (StG 77—77th Diver Bomber Wing), Major Clemens Graf von Schönborn-Wiesentheid. On 24 January 1942, Grasser attacked and shot down an Ilyushin DB-3 bomber. However, his Messerschmitt Bf 109 F-2 (Werknummer 9704—factory number) was also hit by the aerial gunner of the DB-3 bomber resulting in a forced landing in no man's land. Grasser, who was wounded in the encounter, was rescued by the German infantry.

On 2 July 1942, the 9th Army launched Operation Seydlitz as part of the Battles of Rzhev. Defending against this operation, the Soviet Air Forces (VVS—Voyenno-Vozdushnye Sily) attacked the Luftwaffe airfield at Bryansk on 5 July. II. Gruppe of JG 51 was scrambled and claimed 46 Soviet aircraft shot down for the loss of Bf 109s damaged. That day, Grasser was claimed eight aerial victories, making him an "ace-in-a-day".

North Africa
II. Gruppe had been withdrawn from the Eastern Front in early October 1942 and sent to Jesau in East Prussia, present day Yushny, Bagrationovsky District, for conversion to the Focke-Wulf Fw 190. Conversion training began on 7 October and on 4 November, the unit received the order to convert back to the Bf 109 and to transfer to the Mediterranean theatre. Via various stopovers, II. Gruppe moved to Sidi Ahmed airfield, arriving on 14 November. There, the unit was subordinated to Fliegerführer Tunis (Flying Leader Tunis).

On 31 August 1943, Grasser was awarded the Knight's Cross of the Iron Cross with Oak Leaves. He was the 288th member of the German armed forces to be so honored. The presentation was made by Adolf Hitler at the Wolf's Lair, Hitler's headquarters in Rastenburg on 22 September 1943. Three other Luftwaffe officers were presented with awards that day by Hitler, Hauptmann Günther Rall and Hauptmann Walter Nowotny were awarded the Swords to their Knight's Cross with Oak Leaves, and Hauptmann Heinrich Prinz zu Sayn-Wittgenstein also received the Knight's Cross with Oak Leaves. Grasser was then transferred to the staff of commanding general of the 4. Jagd-Division (4th Fighter Division), and was promoted to Major on 1 December 1943.

On 28 April 1944, Grasser succeeded Hauptmann Friedrich Eberle as commander of III. Gruppe of Jagdgeschwader 1 (JG 1—1st Fighter Wing) which was based at Quedlinburg and fighting in Defense of the Reich. On 3 June, Grasser transferred command of III. Gruppe to Hauptmann Karl-Heinz Weber who had previously commanded 7. Staffel of JG 1 on the Eastern Front. On 15 October, Grasser took command of II. Gruppe of Jagdgeschwader 110 (JG 110—110th Fighter Wing).

Later life
In May 1945, Grasser was taken prisoner of war by United States Armed Forces. In 1946, he was transferred to the Soviet Union and was released in 1949. Following his return to Germany, he relocated to India where he became a civilian flight instructor. In 1950, he moved to Syria to work as a military advisor to the Syrian Air Force in Damascus.

Summary of career

Aerial victory claims
According to US historian David T. Zabecki, Grasser was credited with 103 aerial victories. Mathews and Foreman, authors of Luftwaffe Aces — Biographies and Victory Claims, researched the German Federal Archives and found records for more than 96 aerial victory claims, plus six further unconfirmed claims. This figure includes 83 aerial victories on the Eastern Front and over 13 on the Western Front, including one four-engined bomber.

Victory claims were logged to a map-reference (PQ = Planquadrat), for example "PQ 47524". These sectors were then subdivided into 36 smaller units to give a location area 3 × 4 km in size.

Awards
 Iron Cross (1939)
 2nd Class (17 September 1939)
 1st Class (7 July 1940)
 German Cross in Gold on 19 September 1942 as Hauptmann in the II./Jagdgeschwader 51
 Knight's Cross of the Iron Cross with Oak Leaves
 Knight's Cross on 4 September 1941 as Oberleutnant and pilot in the II./Jagdgeschwader 51
 288th Oak Leaves on 31 August 1943 as Major and Gruppenkommandeur of the II./Jagdgeschwader 51 "Mölders"

Promotions

Notes

References

Citations

Bibliography

 
 
 
 
 
 
 
 
 
 
 
 
 
 
 
 
 
 
 
 
 
 
 

1914 births
1986 deaths
German prisoners of war in World War II held by the Soviet Union
German prisoners of war in World War II held by the United States
German World War II flying aces
Military personnel from Graz
Recipients of the Knight's Cross of the Iron Cross with Oak Leaves
Recipients of the Gold German Cross